Houhu Boulevard Station, is an interchange station between Line 3 and Yangluo line of the Wuhan Metro. It entered revenue service on December 28, 2015. It is located in Jiang'an District. It is current the terminus of Yangluo line.

Station layout

Gallery

References

Wuhan Metro stations
Line 3, Wuhan Metro
Yangluo Line, Wuhan Metro
Railway stations in China opened in 2015